Atea is a municipality in the province of Zaragoza, Aragon, Spain. It is part of the comarca of Campo de Daroca.

The town is located near the Sierra de Santa Cruz.

References

External links
Ayuntamiento de Atea

Municipalities in the Province of Zaragoza